Qina Mich'i (Aymara  qina, qina qina a musical instrument, mich'i bow, Hispanicized spellings Quenameche, Quinamichi) is a  mountain in the Andes of southern Peru. It is located in the Tacna Region, Candarave Province, Candarave District. Qina Mich'i lies north of Such'i Lake (Suches). Jichu Qullu is the name of the mountain southwest of it.

References

Mountains of Tacna Region
Mountains of Peru